The Luwians  were a group of Anatolian peoples who lived in central, western, and southern Anatolia, in present-day Turkey, during the Bronze Age and the Iron Age. They spoke the Luwian language, an Indo-European language of the Anatolian sub-family, which was written in cuneiform imported from Mesopotamia, and a unique native hieroglyphic script, which was sometimes used by the linguistically-related Hittites as well.

Luwian was probably spoken over a larger geographic region than Hittite.

History

Origins

There is no consensus on the origins of the Luwians. Armenia, Iran, the Balkans, the Pontic–Caspian steppe and Central Asia have all been suggested.

Their route into Anatolia is unknown. Linguist Craig Melchert suggested they were related to the Demirci Hüyük culture, implying entry into Anatolia from ancient Thrace circa 3000 BC. More plausible is a westward migration route along the  Aras river toward Cilicia by proto-Luwians of the rapidly expanding Kura–Araxes culture.

Middle Bronze Age 

Luwians first appear in the historical record around 2000 BC, with the presence of personal names and loan words in Old Assyrian Empire documents from the Assyrian colony of Kültepe, dating from between 1950 and 1700 BC (Middle Chronology), which shows that Luwian and Hittite were already two distinct languages at this point. The Luwians most likely lived in southern and western Anatolia, perhaps with a political centre at Purushanda. The Assyrian colonists and traders who were present in Anatolia at this time refer to the local people as nuwaʿum without any differentiation. This term seems to derive from the name of the Luwians, with the change from l/n resulting from the mediation of Hurrian.

Hittite period 

The Old Hittite laws from the 17th century BC contain cases relating to the then independent regions of Palā and Luwiya. Traders and displaced people seem to have moved from one country to the other on the basis of agreements between Ḫattusa and Luwiya. It has been argued that the Luwians never formed a single unified Luwian state, but populated a number of polities where they mixed with other population groups. However, a minority opinion holds that in the end they did form a unified force, and brought about the end of Bronze Age civilization by attacking the Hittites and then other areas as the Sea People.

In the south was the state of Kizzuwatna, which was inhabited by a mixture of Hurrians and Luwians. The kingdom of Tarḫuntašša developed during the Hittite New Kingdom, in southern Anatolia. The kingdom of Wilusa was located in northwest Anatolia on the site of Troy. Whether any of these kingdoms represented a Luwian state cannot be clearly determined based on current evidence and is a matter of controversy in contemporary scholarship.

Petra Goedegebuure of the Oriental Institute has argued that Luwian was spoken from the eastern Aegean coast to Melid and as far north as Alaca Hoyuk during the Hittite Kingdom.

Kizzuwatna 

Kizzuwatna was the Hittite and Luwian name for ancient Cilicia. The area was conquered by the Hittites in the 16th century BC. Around 1500, the area broke off and became the kingdom of Kizzuwatna, whose ruler used the title of "Great King", like the Hittite ruler. The Hittite king Telipinu had to conclude a treaty with King Išputaḫšu, which was renewed by his successors. Under King Pilliya, Kizzuwatna became a vassal of the Mitanni. Around 1420, King Šunaššura of Mitanni renounced control of Kizzuwatna and concluded an alliance with the Hittite king Tudḫaliya I. Soon after this, the area seems to have been incorporated into the Hittite empire and remained so until its collapse around 1190 BC at the hands of Assyria and Phrygia.

Šeḫa 

Šeḫa was in the area of ancient Lydia. It is first attested in the fourteenth century BC, when the Hittite king Tudḫaliya I campaigned against Wilusa. After the conquest of Arzawa by Muršili II, Šeḫa was a vassal of the Hittite realm and suffered raids from the Arzawan prince Piyamaradu, who attacked the island of Lazpa which belonged to Šeḫa.

Arzawa 

Arzawa is already attested in the time of the Hittite Old Kingdom, but lay outside the Hittite realm at that time. The first hostile interaction occurred under King Tudḫaliya I or Tudḫaliya II. The invasion of the Hittite realm by the Kaskians led to the decline of Hittite power and the expansion of Arzawa, whose king Tarḫuntaradu was asked by Pharaoh Amenhotep III to send one of his daughters to him as a wife. After a long period of warfare, the Arzawan capital of Apaša (Ephesus) was surrendered by King Uḫḫaziti to the Hittites under King Muršili II. Arzawa was split into two vassal states: Mira and Ḫapalla.

Post-Hittite period 

After the collapse of the Hittite Empire c. 1180 BCE, several small principalities developed in northern Syria and southwestern Anatolia. In south-central Anatolia was Tabal which probably consisted of several small city-states, in Cilicia there was Quwê, in northern Syria was Gurgum, on the Euphrates there were Melid, Kummuh, Carchemish and (east of the river) Masuwara, while on the Orontes River there were Unqi-Pattin and Hamath. The princes and traders of these kingdoms used Hieroglyphic Luwian in inscriptions, the latest of which date to the 8th century BC. The Karatepe Bilingual inscription of prince Azatiwada is particularly important.

These states were largely destroyed and incorporated into the Neo-Assyrian Empire (911–605 BC) during the 9th century BC.

See also 
 Luwian language
 Luwian religion
 Hieroglyphic Luwian
 Luwian Studies
 Luwian-Aramean states

References

Sources

 Hartmut Blum. “Luwier in der Ilias?”, Troia – Traum und Wirklichkeit: Ein Mythos in Geschichte und Rezeption, in: Tagungsband zum Symposion im Braunschweigischen Landesmuseum am 8. und 9. Juni 2001 im Rahmen der Ausstellung “Troia: Traum und Wirklichkeit”. Braunschweig: Braunschweigisches Landesmuseum, 2003. , pp. 40–47.
 
 
 
 
 Billie Jean Collins, Mary R. Bachvarova, & Ian C. Rutherford, eds. Anatolian Interfaces: Hittites, Greeks and their Neighbours. London: Oxbow Books, 2008.
 
 
 
 
 
 
 H. Craig Melchert, ed. The Luwians. Leiden: Brill, 2003, .
 also in: Die Hethiter und ihr Reich. Exhibition catalog. Stuttgart: Theiss, 2002, .
 
 
 
 
 
 Ilya S. Yakubovich. Sociolinguistics of the Luvian Language. Leiden: Brill, 2010. .
 Eberhard Zangger. The Luwian Civilisation: The Missing Link in the Aegean Bronze Age. Istanbul: Yayinlari, 2016, .

External links
 Luwian Studies.org
 Urs Willmann: Räuberbanden im Mittelmeer. In: Zeit Online, 2016
 "The Luwians: A Lost Civilization Comes Back to Life" keynote lecture by Dr. Eberhard Zangger given at Klosters' 50th Winterseminar, 18 January 2015 (online at Luwian Studies YouTube Channel)
 Eberhard Zangger and Serdal Mutlu, Putting the Luwian Culture on the Map American Society of Overseas Research January 2023

 
Ancient peoples of the Near East
Anatolian peoples
Late Bronze Age collapse
Indo-European peoples
Bronze Age peoples of Asia
Iron Age peoples of Asia